Hong Kong Shue Yan University (HKSYU or SYU) is a private liberal-arts university on Braemar Hill, North Point, Hong Kong. Founded in 1971 as Hong Kong Shue Yan College by Henry Hu and Chung Chi-yung, it was unilaterally recognised as the first private university by the order of the Chief Executive on 19 December 2006. According to QS World University Rankings 2023, it ranked #351-400 in Asia, and #198 in Eastern Asia.

History
Hong Kong Shue Yan College was founded on 20 September 1971 by Dr Henry H.L. Hu, then Legislative Councillor, and Dr Chung Chi-Yung, a prominent educationist.

In 1971, Dr Chung resigned from her post as faculty head of the Faculty of Arts and Social Sciences of the then Hong Kong Baptist College and planned to establish a kindergarten. However, her husband, Dr Hu, suggested founding a university instead and invested his savings from his work as a barrister in it, purchasing a three-story house at Sing Woo Road, Happy Valley as campus. They were concerned that provision for tertiary education in Hong Kong was made for less than 2% of the relevant age group and also that the Cultural Revolution in mainland China would undermine traditional Chinese values.

The government of Hong Kong at the time was interested in the prospects of an independent, private liberal arts school, and granted a piece of land at Braemar Hill to construct a permanent campus in 1978. The construction was completed in September 1985, and various additions to the campus were constructed after that time.

Due to Shue Yan's refusal to follow the government's model and plan for higher education in return for government funding in the late 1970s, Shue Yan development was often restricted. Shue Yan's unrelenting position to offer four-year programmes meant that it had to operate as a truly private institution, without any government funding. Because of this, Shue Yan cannot meet the three-year university degree requirement and has to refer itself as a college rather than a university. However it provided an opportunity to access higher education for students who were unable to secure a place at a local university.

In 2000, the Education Bureau of Hong Kong provided a fund of HKD 4.6 million for academic accreditation. In 2001, Hong Kong Shue Yan College passed the academic accreditation of the Hong Kong Council for Accreditation of Academic and Vocational Qualifications and was allowed to offer three courses leading to different Honours bachelor's degrees. In the same year, the Hong Kong Government amended the Post Secondary Colleges Ordinance (Cap 320), allowing accredited post secondary colleges to award degrees under the approval of the Chief Executive-in-Council. Hong Kong Shue Yan College thus became the first private tertiary education institute in Hong Kong that can award Honours bachelor's degrees.

On 19 December 2006, the Executive Council passed a resolution to recognise and accredit Hong Kong Shue Yan College as Hong Kong's first private university, with immediate effect. Hong Kong Shue Yan College subsequently rectified its name to Hong Kong Shue Yan University. It was the first time a university had been established via Executive Council resolution. All other universities in Hong Kong have been established by ordinance approved by the Legislative Council of the HKSAR.

As there is a shortage of government-funded degrees, there were plans for SYU and the OUHK to participate in JUPAS as alternatives for students. While the OUHK has accepted and designed some programmes specifically for such students since 2006, SYU announced they would not be participating in JUPAS in the foreseeable future. SYU become the only university in Hong Kong that declined to join JUPAS and UGC.

In January 2007, the HKSAR government offered a one-time grant of HKD200 million (although possibly less) to establish a general development fund for SYU. The University may use the interest to support its academic development and improve the campus facilities.

Campus
The SYU campus is situated on Braemar Hill on Hong Kong Island, and offers a view of the Victoria Harbour. The land the campus rests on was granted by the Hong Kong Government in 1978, with the first building completed in 1985.

The campus consists of four parts:
Education and Administration Complex- Completed construction in 1985, the complex is 11 stories high and houses classrooms, computer labs, lecture halls, ceremony halls, cafeterias, sports facilities, and staff offices.
Library Complex- Completed construction in 1995, the complex is 19 stories high, and houses the campus library, car park, conference hall and apartments for academic staff.
Residential & Amenities Complex- Completed construction in 2005, the complex is 29 stories high, and houses student dormitories, student services, swimming pool, sports facilities, café, conference rooms, and multipurpose facilities. The student union and student activities center are also housed in this complex.

 Research Complex- Completed construction in 2016.

Programmes

Bachelor of Arts with Honours
 Journalism and Mass Communication
 Chinese Language and Literature
 English Language and Literature
 Media Design and Immersive Technology
 History
 Economics & Finance

Bachelor of Social Sciences with Honours
 Counselling & Psychology
 Psychology
 Sociology
 Arts, Technology and Culture (ACT)

Bachelor of Science with Honours
 Applied Data Science
 Economics (collaborated with University of Leicester, U.K.)

Bachelor of Commerce with Honours
Financial Technology
Accounting (Professional Recognition: HKICPA, United Kingdom's ACCA, CIMA, AIA, Canadian CMA, CGA)
Law & Business

Bachelor of Business Administration with Honours
General (BBA with Hons)
Human Resources Management - Applied Psychology
Digital Marketing
Corporate Governance and Risk Management

Bachelor of Social Work

The Bachelor of Social Work (BSW) program is accredited and recognized by the Social Work Registration Board (SWRB) in Hong Kong. Upon graduation, our BSW graduates would be eligible to apply for the Registered Social Worker (RSW) status with the SWRB.

Master of Social Sciences 
Counselling Psychology
Psychology
Play Therapy

Master of Science 
Marketing and Consumer Psychology

MPhil/PhD Programmes 

 in Chinese, English, History, Sociology, Economics and Psychology

Faculties
Academic Departments at SYU are grouped in faculties

Faculty of Commerce
 Department of Accounting
 Department of Business Administration
 Department of Economics and Finance 
 Department of Law and Business

Faculty of Arts
 Department of Journalism and Communication
 Department of Chinese Language & Literature
 Department of English Language & Literature
 Department of History

Faculty of Social Sciences
 Department of Counselling and Psychology
 Department of Social Work
 Department of Sociology
 Department of Applied Data Science

Partnerships
Hong Kong Shue Yan University has partnerships with universities in UK and Australia. The universities are University of Stirling, University of Wollongong, and University of Leicester. Split-degree programmes are offered, where the first two years are spent at SYU and the latter two in the overseas universities.

In 2013, the university also entered into collaboration with Birkbeck, University of London. The Trans-jurisdictional Legal Theory and Policy Research Centre enables scholars from both participating universities to develop comparative research projects and visit each other's institutions to teach. Up to 15 students per year from Shue Yan University are admitted onto the Qualifying Law Programme (LLM) at Birkbeck.

See also
:Category:Alumni of Queen's College, Hong Kong
 List of universities in Hong Kong

External links
 Official Website
 Library
 Student Union

Shue Yan University
Shue Yan University
Educational institutions established in 1971
Shue Yan University